Twisted Nerve Records was a Manchester, England-based record label, founded by Damon Gough (AKA Badly Drawn Boy) and Andy Votel.

Best known for being the home of Badly Drawn Boy and Alfie, the label was active between 1997 and 2012.

Musical artists
Artists who have released records on Twisted Nerve Records include:

 Alfie
 Badly Drawn Boy
 Cherrystones
 Dave Tyack
 DOT
 Jukes
 Little Miss Trinitron
 Luma Lane
 Misty Dixon
 Mum And Dad
 Rebelski
 Sirconical
 Sam and the plants
 Aidan Smith
 Supreme Vagabond Craftsman
 Toolshed
 Andy Votel
 Voice of the Seven Woods
 Twinkranes

See also 
 List of record labels

External links
 Official website

British record labels
Music in Manchester
Companies based in Manchester
Indie rock record labels
Vanity record labels